"Hold Me" is a song by the band Earth, Wind & Fire, released as a single in 2003 by Kalimba Music. The single peaked at No. 28 on the Billboard Adult R&B Songs chart.

Overview
"Hold Me" was executively produced by Maurice White and Phillip Bailey. It was produced and composed by Bob Robinson and Tim Kelley for the band's 2003 studio album The Promise.

Accolades
"Hold Me" was Grammy nominated in the category of Best Traditional R&B Vocal Performance.

Personnel
Lead vocals – Maurice White, Philip Bailey
Backing vocals - Krystal Johnson
Guitar – Bob Robinson
Keyboards, drum programming, bass, drums – Tim Kelley 

Arranged by Tim Kelley
Composed by Bob Robinson, Tim Kelley
Executive Producers – Maurice White, Philip Bailey
Producers – Bob Robinson, Tim Kelley

References

2003 singles
Earth, Wind & Fire songs
Songs written by Tim Kelley
Songs written by Bob Robinson (songwriter)
2003 songs